The Corieltauvi (also the Coritani, and the Corieltavi) were a tribe of people living in Britain prior to the Roman conquest, and thereafter a civitas of Roman Britain. Their territory was in what is now the English East Midlands. They were bordered by the Brigantes to the north, the Cornovii to the west, the Dobunni and Catuvellauni to the south, and the Iceni to the east. Their capital was called Ratae Corieltauvorum, known today as Leicester.

Late Iron Age
The Corieltauvi were a largely agricultural people who had few strongly defended sites or signs of centralised government. They appear to have been a federation of smaller, self-governing tribal groups. From the beginning of the 1st century, they began to produce inscribed coins: almost all featured two names, and one series had three, suggesting they had multiple rulers. The names on the earliest coins are so abbreviated as to be unidentifiable. Later coins feature the name of Volisios, apparently the paramount king of the region, together with names of three presumed sub-kings, Dumnocoveros, Dumnovellaunus and Cartivelios, in three series minted ca. 45 AD. The Corieltauvi had an important mint, and possibly a tribal centre, at Sleaford.

The discovery in 2000 of the Hallaton Treasure more than doubled the total number of Corieltauvian coins previously recorded.
In 2014 26 gold and silver Corieltauvian coins were found in Reynard's Kitchen Cave in Derbyshire.

Roman times
There is little evidence that the Corieltauvi offered resistance to Roman rule: Ratae was captured c. AD 44, and it may have had a Roman garrison.

The Fosse Way, a Roman road, passed through their territory.

Name
Their name appears as Coritani and Coritavi in Ptolemy's 2nd century Geography. However, the Ravenna Cosmography gives the name of their capital, in apparently corrupt form, as Rate Corion Eltavori, and an inscribed tile found in Churchover calls the administrative district Civitas Corieltauvorum, indicating that the true form should be Corieltauvi.

Manley Pope, author of an early English translation of the Welsh chronicle Brut y Brenhinedd, associated the Coritani of the Roman writers with the magical race called the Coraniaid in the medieval Welsh tale Lludd and Llevelys, however this is not supported by modern historical linguistics.

The name has been adopted by the athletics club, Leicester Coritanian A.C.

The Barnetby bull rider 
A detectorist found a small figure of a woman riding a bull in a field in Barnetby le Wold, Lincolnshire in 2016. The piece was handed over to the British Museum's Portable Antiquities Scheme, and experts declared it to be of regional importance. Adam Staples, from Essex Coin Auctions, said it was thought to be the only recorded example of a figure riding a bull and probably dated from the early 1st century AD. "It is such a unique piece and begs the question just who was she? Was she a slave, a priestess, a Queen?", he said. Staples suggested that the bull rider would have been fixed to the top of a bowl "that may have been filled with blood during ritual sacrifices." The figure was auctioned for £7,800 on 9 November 2022.

References

History of Leicestershire
People from Leicestershire
Celtic Britons
Historical Celtic peoples